This list covers the commanders of the various special forces of the Turkish Armed Forces; namely, the Tactical Mobilisation Group, 1952–65; the Special Warfare Department, 1965–1994; and the Special Forces Command (

.

References

Special Forces
Special forces of Turkey
Turkish Land Forces
Special Warfare Department personnel